People with the German surname Kalckstein include:

Albrecht von Kalckstein (1592-1667), Prussian nobleman
Christian Ludwig von Kalckstein (1630-1672), executed Prussian nobleman
Christoph Wilhelm von Kalckstein (1682-1759), Prussian field marshal
Ludwig Karl von Kalckstein (1725–1800) Prussian field marshal.
Karl Georg Otto Willibald von Kalckstein (1812-1894) politician

German-language surnames
Military families of Germany